Hamida Djandoubi (22 September 1949 – 10 September 1977) was a Tunisian convicted murderer sentenced to death in France. He moved to Marseille in 1968, and six years later he kidnapped, tortured and murdered 22-year-old Élisabeth Bousquet. He was sentenced to death in February 1977 and executed by guillotine in September that year. He was the last person to be executed in Western Europe, and also the last person to be lawfully executed by beheading anywhere in the Western world, although he was not the last person sentenced to death in France. Marcel Chevalier served as chief executioner.

Early life 
Born in Tunisia on 22 September 1949, Djandoubi started living in Marseille in 1968, working in a grocery store. He later worked as a landscaper but had a workplace accident in 1971: his leg got caught in the tracks of a tractor and resulted in the loss of two-thirds of his right leg.

Allegation of forced prostitution 
In 1973, a 21-year-old woman named Élisabeth Bousquet, whom Djandoubi had met in the hospital while recovering from his amputation, filed a complaint against him, stating that he had tried to force her into prostitution.

Murder of Élisabeth Bousquet 
After his arrest and eventual release from custody during the spring of 1973, Djandoubi drew two other young girls into his confidence and then forced them into prostitution for him. On 3 July 1974, he kidnapped Bousquet and took her into his home where, in full view of the terrified girls, he beat the woman before stubbing a lit cigarette all over her breasts and genital area. Bousquet survived the ordeal so he took her by car to the outskirts of Marseille and strangled her there.

On his return, Djandoubi warned the two girls to say nothing of what they had seen. Bousquet's body was discovered in a shed by a boy on 7 July 1974. One month later, Djandoubi kidnapped another girl who managed to escape and report him to police.

Trial and execution 
After a lengthy pre-trial process, Djandoubi eventually appeared in court in Aix-en-Provence on charges of torture-murder, rape and premeditated violence on 24 February 1977. His main defence revolved around the supposed effects of the amputation of his leg six years earlier which his lawyer claimed had driven him to a paroxysm of alcohol abuse and violence, turning him into a different man.

On 25 February, he was sentenced to death. An appeal against his sentence was rejected on 9 June. In the early morning of 10 September 1977, twelve days before his 28th birthday, Djandoubi was informed that he, like the child murderers Christian Ranucci (executed on 28 July 1976) and Jérôme Carrein (executed on 23 June 1977), had not received a reprieve from President Valéry Giscard d'Estaing. Shortly afterwards, at 4:40 a.m., he was executed by guillotine at Baumettes Prison in Marseille.

While Djandoubi was the last person executed in France, he was not the last condemned. No more executions occurred after capital punishment was abolished in France in 1981 following the election of François Mitterrand, and those sentenced to die had their sentences commuted. Djandoubi's death was the last time any Western nation carried out an execution by beheading, as well as the most recent government-sanctioned guillotine execution in the world.

See also 
 Nicolas Jacques Pelletier, the first person to be executed by guillotine in France in 1792, during the French Revolution.
 Eugen Weidmann, the last person to be publicly executed by guillotine in France in 1939.

Further reading 
 
 Jean-Yves Le Nahour, Le Dernier guillotiné, Paris, First Editions, 2011

References

External links 
 Various photos, newspaper articles, and court documents related to the Djandoubi case

1949 births
1977 deaths
French amputees
20th-century French criminals
20th-century Tunisian criminals
French people convicted of murder
Executed French people
French pimps
Tunisian kidnappers
People convicted of assault
People convicted of murder by France
People executed by France by guillotine
People executed by the French Fifth Republic
People executed for murder
Criminals from Marseille
Tunisian people convicted of murder
Tunisian people executed abroad
Tunisian amputees